The Society of Jewish Ethics is an academic organization which promotes scholarly work in the field of Jewish ethics.

Presidents of the Society have included:

Michal Raucher, 2021-
Joel Gereboff, 2019-2021
Aaron S. Gross, 2017-2019
 Geoffrey Claussen, 2015-2017
 Jonathan K. Crane, 2013-2015
 Aaron L. Mackler, 2011-2013
Toby Schonfeld, 2009-2011
 David Teutsch, 2007-2009
 Elliot N. Dorff, 2005-2007
 Louis E. Newman, 2003-2005 (founding president)<ref>Noam J. Zohar, Quality of life in Jewish bioethics'," p. 138</ref>

Journal of Jewish Ethics

The Society publishes a scholarly journal titled the Journal of Jewish Ethics.''  The founding editors of the journal were Louis E. Newman and Jonathan K. Crane. The current editors of the journal are Jonathan K. Crane and Emily Filler.

The editorial board has included Elliot N. Dorff, Robert B. Gibbs, Alyssa Gray, Martin Kavka, Jonathan Sacks, David Teutsch, Noam Zohar, Laurie Zoloth, Julia Watts Belser, Yonatan Brafman, Geoffrey Claussen, Aaron S. Gross, Jeffrey Israel, Michal Raucher, Danya Ruttenberg, Moses Pava, Suzanne Last Stone, and Jonathan Schofer.

References

External links
 Official website

Professional associations based in the United States
Learned societies of the United States
Jewish ethics
Ethics organizations